The oxalate phosphates are chemical compounds containing oxalate and phosphate anions.  They are also called oxalatophosphates or phosphate oxalates. Some oxalate-phosphate minerals found in bat guano deposits are known. Oxalate phosphates can form metal organic framework compounds.

Related compounds include the arsenate oxalates, and phosphite oxalates, oxalatomethylphosphonate, and potentially other oxalate phosphonates.

List

References 

Oxalates
Phosphates
Mixed anion compounds